Princess Huyền Trân (玄珍公主) (1289-1340) was a princess of the Trần Dynasty of Đại Việt, who later married to King Jaya Simhavarman III of Champa and titled queen consort Parameshvari of Champa from 1306 to 1307.

Biography
She was the daughter of Emperor Trần Nhân Tông and the younger sister of Emperor Trần Anh Tông. There are few details in the historical record about Huyền Trân's life. In 1293, Trần Nhân Tông abdicated in favor of his son, Trần Anh Tông, in order to become a monk in a pagoda on Mount Yên Tử in what is now Quảng Ninh Province.

In 1301, the Emperor's father, Trần Nhân Tông, visited the Kingdom of Champa and was given a lavish royal welcome by King Jaya Simhavarman III (Vietnamese: Chế Mân, 制旻). The visit lasted nine months. When Trần Nhân Tông left Champa for Đại Việt (the name of Vietnam at the time), he promised to give his daughter in marriage, even though the Cham king was already married to a Javanese woman named Tapasi. Jaya Simhavarman III thereafter sent many envoys to Đại Việt to urge the Trần emperor to carry out the marriage plan as Trần Nhân Tông had promised but the Emperor refused. Among the Emperor's men, only General Văn Túc Đạo Tái and Minister Trần Khắc Chung supported the marriage.

In 1306, on orders of Trần Anh Tông, Huyền Trân was married to the Champa king as Queen Parameshvari of Champa, in return for the two provinces of Châu Ô and Châu Lý (or Châu Rí) (today these provinces are Quảng Bình, Quảng Trị and Thừa Thiên–Huế).

Huyền Trân went to Champa but a year later, in May 1307, Jaya Sinhavarman III died and the crown prince sent an ambassador to Đại Việt to offer white elephants as gifts and announced the death of his king. According to Cham tradition, all of the royal wives would be cremated with the dead king. Trần Anh Tông ordered a general named Trần Khắc Chung to go to Champa to officially attend the funeral but the real mission was for Trần Khắc Chung to rescue Huyền Trân and take her back to Đại Việt by boat. The trip back took a year. Legends had it that Trần Khắc Chung fell in love with Huyền Trân and the two disappeared from sight together but there is no historical proof to back up this story.

Huyền Trân in art
The sacrifice of princess Huyền Trân (well known in Vietnamese literature and history as "Huyền Trân Công Chúa") has become an attractive topic for poems and arts and music in Vietnamese chữ Nôm. Her marriage is also proverbial.
 Play: Huyên Trân công chúa (Princess Huyền Trân) by Đoàn Thanh Ái
 Literature: Hermitage Among the Clouds by Thích Nhất Hạnh
 Poems: Princess Huyền Trân by Hoàng Cao Khải, and Farewell to Huyền Trân by Đào Tiến Luyện
 Music: Epic of the Mandarin Road, 
Farewell to Huyền Trân by Đào Tiến Luyện, set to music by Phạm Duy, 
Princess Huyền Trân by musician Nguyễn Hiền, 
Missing by musician Châu Kỳ, 
Love story of Huyền Trân by Nam Lộc, 
Hard life in Champa (folklore song).
Most cities in Vietnam have named major streets after her.

References

1289 births
14th-century deaths
Trần dynasty princesses
Vietnamese Buddhist nuns
History of Champa
Deified Vietnamese people
14th-century Buddhist nuns
13th-century Vietnamese women
14th-century Vietnamese women
Queens consort